Gary Allen Feess (born March 13, 1948) is a former United States district judge of the United States District Court for the Central District of California.

Education and career

Feess was born in Alliance, Ohio. He received a Bachelor of Arts degree from Ohio State University in 1970 and a Juris Doctor from the UCLA School of Law in 1974. He was in private practice in Los Angeles, California from 1974 to 1979, from 1987 to 1988, and again from 1989 to 1996. He was an Assistant United States Attorney in the Central District of California from 1979 to 1987 and Chief Assistant United States Attorney from 1988 to 1989. Later, he was a general counsel for the Christopher Commission. He was a judge on the Los Angeles Superior Court from 1996 to 1999.

Federal judicial service

Feess was nominated by President Bill Clinton on January 26, 1999, to a United States District Court for the Central District of California seat that had been vacated by James M. Ideman. Feess was confirmed by the United States Senate on June 30, 1999, and received his commission on July 7, 1999. In 2000, Feess was selected to be the judge in charge of implementing the consent decree filed against the Los Angeles Police Department in the aftermath of the Rodney King riots and the Rampart scandal. Feess assumed senior status on March 13, 2014. He retired from active service on January 5, 2015.

References

External links

1948 births
Living people
Assistant United States Attorneys
Judges of the United States District Court for the Central District of California
Ohio State University alumni
People from Alliance, Ohio
Superior court judges in the United States
United States district court judges appointed by Bill Clinton
UCLA School of Law alumni
20th-century American judges
21st-century American judges